The 1959 RAC Tourist Trophy was contested on 5 September at the Goodwood Circuit, England. It was the fifth and final round of the 1959 World Sportscar Championship, and was the 24th RAC Tourist Trophy. The race was the title-decider in a three-way contest between Aston Martin, Ferrari and Porsche.

Report

Entry

A grand total 31 racing cars were registered for this event, of which all 31 arrived for practice and qualifying.  The entrant for championship leaders, Scuderia Ferrari, entered four cars for the event. Among their squad include Phil Hill, Tony Brooks and Olivier Gendebien, and they were placed in two cars, spreading the Italian marques options. As for David Brown’s Aston Martins, they had actually ruled against racing in the championship due to the cost, but with a chance of the title, entered three DBR1/300s for Stirling Moss/Roy Salvadori, Carroll Shelby/Jack Fairman and Maurice Trintignant/Paul Frère. The third manufacturer in the title race, Porsche, also brought three cars, led by Jo Bonnier and Wolfgang von Trips.

Qualifying

The Aston Martin DBR1/300 of Stirling Moss took pole position, averaging a speed of 94.737 mph around the 2.4 mile circuit.

Race

The race was run in typically Goodwood Indian summer sun, which saw Aston Martin triumph again, retain the Tourist Trophy, when the combination of Shelby/Fairman, joined late in the race by Moss brought their DBR1/300 home in first place, but Bonnier/von Trips were second for Porsche from Gendebien/Hill/Brooks/Cliff Allison.

This does not tell the full story for at Salvadori’s first fuel stop, the car caught fire during refuelling, destroying it along with the pit et al. Graham Whitehead sportingly withdrew his privately entered Aston Martin so that the David Brown’s work cars would have a home, and Moss was transferred to the Shelby/Fairman motor; as a result of this win Aston Martin became the 1959 World Champions.

The winning trio of Sheby/Fairman/Moss won in a time of 6hr 00:46.8 mins., averaging a speed of 89.406 mph. They covered a distance of 537.6 miles. One lap adrift was the Bonnier/van Trips’s Porsche, with the first Ferrari home also one lap behind.

Official Classification

Class Winners are in Bold text.

 Fastest Lap: Stirling Moss, 1:31.2 secs (94.737 mph)

Class Winners

Standings after the race

Championship points were awarded for the first six places in each race in the order of 8-6-4-3-2-1. Manufacturers were only awarded points for their highest finishing car with no points awarded for positions filled by additional cars. Only the best 3 results out of the 5 races could be retained by each manufacturer. Points earned but not counted towards the championship totals are listed within brackets in the above table.

References

RAC
RAC Tourist Trophy
RAC